John G. Fleagle is an American anthropologist, primatologist, and Distinguished Professor at State University of New York, Stony Brook.

He graduated from Yale University cum laude in 1971, and from Harvard University with a M.S. in Anthropology in 1973, and from Harvard University, with a Ph.D. in Biological Anthropology in 1976.

Awards
 1988 MacArthur Fellows Program
 1982 Guggenheim Fellowship

Works
A selection of Fleagle's works is listed below.

Anthropoid origins, Editors John G. Fleagle, Richard F. Kay, Plenum Press, 1994, 
Primate communities, Editors John G. Fleagle, Charles Helmar Janson, Kaye E. Reed, Cambridge University Press, 1999, 
Primate adaptation and evolution, Academic Press, 2nd edition 1999, ; 3rd edition 2013 
Primate biogeography: progress and prospects, editors Shawn M. Lehman, John G. Fleagle, Springer, 2006, 
Elwyn Simons: a search for origins, Editors John G. Fleagle, Christopher C. Gilbert, Springer, 2007,

References

Year of birth missing (living people)
Living people
Yale University alumni
Harvard Graduate School of Arts and Sciences alumni
Stony Brook University faculty
MacArthur Fellows
Primatologists
20th-century American anthropologists
21st-century American anthropologists